Arnold Stanley Picton (28 June 1899 – 8 June 1962) was the Archdeacon of Blackburn from 1959 until his death.

He was educated at King's College London, Christ Church, Oxford and Ripon College Cuddesdon and ordained in  1918. After  curacies in Warrington and Millom  he held incumbencies in Barrow-in-Furness and Preston before his archdeacon's appointment.

References

1899 births
1962 deaths
Alumni of King's College London
Alumni of Christ Church, Oxford
Alumni of Ripon College Cuddesdon
Archdeacons of Blackburn